The Pallone Azzurro ("Azure Football") is an individual award assigned by the FIGC to the best Italian player according to the votes of the fans registered to Vivo Azzurro, the official fan club of the Italy national football team.

The fans vote one recipient from a shortlist of candidates selected from the "Man of the Match" awards given to players after the matches of the various Italy national football teams during the previous year.

Winners

References

External links 
 FIGC official website

Italy
Italian football trophies and awards
Awards established in 2012
Awards disestablished in 2016